North and South Twin Lakes are two nearly identical natural lakes in Deschutes County, Oregon. Both were formed around 20,000 years ago when a rising magma reservoir reached groundwater, creating violent steam explosions. Two craters were formed, later filling with water.

In 1987, the Oregon Department of Fish and Wildlife poisoned South Twin Lake to remove rough fish. The lake is stocked with fingerlings and rainbow trout. North Twin Lake was illegally stocked with catfish some time before 2008.

The Twin Lakes have surprisingly calm winds compared to other Cascade Lakes. South Twin Lake is completely tree-lined except for the beach day-use area. Water levels vary little over the season. The lake is rich with weedbeds.

See also
 List of lakes in Oregon

References

External links

 North Twin Lake Forest Service page

Lakes of Oregon
Lakes of Deschutes County, Oregon
Deschutes National Forest
Protected areas of Deschutes County, Oregon